Phaya Thai Road is a major road in Bangkok, Thailand. It begins at the south side of Victory Monument in Ratchathewi District and continues until Sam Yan Intersection in Pathum Wan District, where it intersects with Rama IV Road.

Between Victory Monument and Rama I Road, Phaya Thai Road runs directly below the Sukhumvit Line of the BTS Skytrain. Phaya Thai is also the name of a stop on this line, just past the intersection of Phaya Thai Road and Si Ayutthaya Road.

Phaya Thai District is named after this road. Since its creation in 1966, however, the district has been subdivided several times, so that now Phaya Thai Road is no longer within Phaya Thai District.

Streets in Bangkok